Victor Henry Palmieri (born February 16, 1930) is an American lawyer, real estate financier and corporate Turnaround specialist. He was also Ambassador at Large and U.S. Coordinator for Refugee Affairs in the United States Department of State during the Jimmy Carter administration.

Background 
Palmieri was born in Chicago, and earned his A.B. and LL.B. from Stanford University. He was admitted to the California Bar in 1954 and was based in Malibu, California. Palmieri was also the chief executive officer of The Palmieri Company, a general management consulting firm that has specialized in large-scale reorganizations and restructurings since 1969.

His participation in a convocation of business leaders and students at Harvard University during the Vietnam War landed him in the Nixon Enemies List.

Palmieri served as the Deputy Rehabilitator and CEO at Mutual Benefit from 1991 until 1994. From 1994 to 1995, He served as the President and CEO of MBL Life Assurance Corp.

He is the retired vice chairman and general counsel of MullinTBG, a leading executive benefits consulting firm located in Los Angeles, CA.  He is currently a director of M Financial Holdings, Southern California Radio, and Chairman of Los Angeles Universal Preschool.

He has been a trustee of the Rockefeller Foundation and president of the Lincoln Center Theater. He was previously on the boards of directors of Phillips Petroleum, Arvida Corporation, Pennsylvania Company, Outlet Communications, the William Carter Company, and Broadcasting Partners.

He has taught courses on corporate crisis management at Stanford Law School and at the John F. Kennedy School of Government at Harvard University.

References

Rohleder, Anna (February 9, 2001). Movers & Shakers. Forbes

1930 births
Living people
American chief executives
20th-century American lawyers
Stanford University alumni
Harvard Kennedy School staff
20th-century American businesspeople
21st-century American lawyers
21st-century American businesspeople
Carter administration personnel
United States Department of State officials
Lawyers from Chicago
Businesspeople from Chicago
United States Ambassadors-at-Large